The  is a rapid transit electric multiple unit (EMU) operated by the Transportation Bureau City of Nagoya on the Nagoya Subway Tsurumai Line in Japan since 1993.

Design
Like other modern cars on the Nagoya Subway lines, the 3050 series uses a variable-frequency drive controller to convert DC current to AC current to power a squirrel cage motor.

Formation
The trainsets are formed as follows.

(Left is toward Toyotashi Station and Akaike Station and right is toward Kamiotai Station and Inuyama Station)

One set was formed by using two surplus 3000 series cars.

References

External links

 Nagoya Transportation Bureau's technical details about the 3050 series 
 Nagoya Transportation Bureau's description of the 3050 series 
 Manufacturer's description of the 3050 series 

Electric multiple units of Japan
3050 series
Train-related introductions in 1993
1500 V DC multiple units of Japan
Nippon Sharyo multiple units